Wilberton Township is one of twenty townships in Fayette County, Illinois, USA.  As of the 2010 census, its population was 505 and it contained 187 housing units. Its name changed from Richland Township on September 24, 1860.

Geography

Extinct towns
 Augsburg
 Saint Paul
 Wilberton

Cemeteries
The township contains these seven cemeteries: Augsburg, Center, Cheshier, Crowder, Frogtown, Riedle and Saint Paul Lutheran.

Lakes
 Gatch Lake

Demographics

School districts
 Brownstown Community Unit School District 201
 Vandalia Community Unit School District 203

Political districts
 Illinois's 19th congressional district
 State House District 102
 State Senate District 51

References
 
 United States Census Bureau 2007 TIGER/Line Shapefiles
 United States National Atlas

External links
 City-Data.com
 Illinois State Archives

Townships in Fayette County, Illinois
Populated places established in 1859
Townships in Illinois
1859 establishments in Illinois